Juan María Sepúlveda (1828 in Los Angeles – 1868 in Los Angeles) was the owner of a ranch in the South Bay area in 1858, located on Santa Monica Bay in Los Angeles County, California. The area, originally part of the Spanish land grant of Rancho Boca de Santa Monica, later became known as the Huntington Palisades. He is the son of Francisco Sepúlveda and Maria Ramona Serrano.

He was named to the Los Angeles Common Council in a special election on August 9, 1853, serving until May 4, 1854.

A native of Los Angeles, he was married to Jesus Alvarado Sepúlveda, and they had a son, Ildefonso A. Sepúlveda, born about 1861.

He died on October 3, 1868.

References

1828 births
1868 deaths
People of Mexican California
Los Angeles Common Council (1850–1889) members
19th-century American politicians
19th century in Los Angeles

California
Mexican
Mexican-American culture in California